Adata Vediya Heta Hondai (Sinhala, Tomorrow Is Better Than Today) is a 1963 Sri Lankan film directed by Indian filmmaker M. Masthan and produced by producer K. Gunaratnam. The film starring Gamini Fonseka and Jeevarani Kurukulasuriya. It was a box office success in the country.

Plot 
 Gamini Fonseka as Gamini
 Jeevarani Kurukulasuriya as Sriyani
 Ananda Jayaratne as Ananda
 Sandhya Kumari as Sandhya
 Vijitha Mallika as Vijitha
 Nelson Karunagama as Doctor
 Ignatius Gunaratne
 Alfred Edirimanne as Alfred 'Thaththa'
 Thalatha Gunasekara
 Hugo Fernando as Gabriel 'Mudalali'
 Anthony C. Perera
 Christy Leonard Perera
 H. D. Kulatunga as Sandhya's Thaththa
 Herbert Amarawickrama
 Kalyani Perera

Songs 

"Sandun Gase" – J. A. Milton Perera and Mallika Kahawita
Sethsiri Sethsiri" – Latha and chorus
"Soka Susum Marathe" – Latha Walpola
"Baloli Loli" – Indrani Wijebandara
"Baloli Loli" – Latha Walpola
"Rasadun Netha Di" – Latha Walpola
"Amma" – Latha Walpola and chorus

References

External links

1963 films